The 2006 World Orienteering Championships, the 23rd World Orienteering Championships, were held in Aarhus, Denmark, 1 –5 August 2006.

The championships had eight events; sprint for men and women, middle distance for men and women, long distance (formerly called individual or classic distance) for men and women, and relays for men and women.

Medalists

References 

World Orienteering Championships
2006 in Danish sport
International sports competitions hosted by Denmark
August 2006 sports events in Europe
Orienteering in Denmark
Sport in Aarhus